The Nassau County Legislature is the lawmaking body of Nassau County, New York. Currently, it has 19 different members from 19 different districts. It was formed in 1996 to succeed the county's Board of Supervisors, which was ruled unconstitutional.

The legislature serves as a check against the county executive. The legislature monitors the performance of county agencies and makes land use decisions as well as legislating on a variety of other issues. The county legislature also has sole responsibility for approving the county budget. All members can serve for as long as they want (there is no term limit), unless expelled. Legislators are elected every two years.

The presiding officer of the county legislature is called the Presiding Officer. The current presiding officer is Richard J. Nicolello, a Republican. The presiding officer sets the agenda and presides at meetings of the legislature. The Republican Party holds an 12-7 majority over the Democratic Party.

Composition

History
When Nassau County first seceded from New York City in 1898, the Nassau County Board of Supervisors was established. It was a six-member board, and each member was a government official from the three towns in the county (Oyster Bay, Hempstead, and North Hempstead) and two cities in the county (Glen Cove and Long Beach). The Town of Hempstead had two voting members. The Board used a weighted vote system based on the Banzhaf power index, meaning the districts smaller in population had near-no representation on the Board.

In 1993, federal district court Judge Arthur D. Spatt ruled the Board of Supervisors unconstitutional, citing its clear violation of the Equal Protection Clause for its failure to adhere to the one man, one vote policy, and failure to represent the minority population. Over a year later, the Board failed to provide a constitutional successor to itself, and the judge said that if they kept ending up in a deadlock and couldn't choose a new plan, he would make one himself. The Board finally chose a plan, creating the Nassau County Legislature, changing the legislative branch of the county for the first time since its establishment, and the first election for the legislature took place in November 1995. The historic first session began on January 1, 1996, with a Republican majority.

The plan the Board of Supervisors adopted was written into the Nassau County Charter, and it called for a nineteen-district legislature, with at least two black-majority districts. This new plan has the legislature always fluctuating from a Democratic majority to a Republican majority, and vice versa, contrary to the regularly Republican Board of Supervisors.

Salary 
Since the legislature's existence in 1996, the salary was made $39,500 in the charter; however the charter the legislature to raise or lower it by law. In December 2015, legislators voted without much debate to raise their salary to $75,000 amidst a county financial crisis; however it went into effect the  session in 2017.

Standing Committees and the Floor 
All issues introduced to the legislature is sent to one of the legislature's committees for review and consideration. Then, it is sent to the Rules Committee for further review and consideration. Once through the Rules Committee, it is sent to the floor for all members to discuss, debate, and vote on. If passed, it is sent to the desk of the County Executive. If it is signed by the County Executive, it is now a local law and is codified in either the Nassau County Administrative Code or the Miscellaneous Laws of Nassau County. All members of the public can attend any public meeting of the legislature, and can speak at floor meetings at a designated time.

Committees 
 Budget Review (Chair: John R. Ferretti Jr.)
 Economic and Community Development and Labor (Chair: Thomas McKevitt)
 Finance (Chair: Howard J. Kopel)
 Government Services and Operations (Chair: John R. Ferretti Jr.)
 Health and Social Services (Chair: Rose Marie Walker)
 Minority Affairs (Chair: Steven D. Rhoads)
 Planning, Development, and the Environment (Chair: Laura Schaefer)
 Public Safety (Chair: Denise Ford)
 Public Works (Chair: C. William Gaylor III)
 Rules (Chair: Richard J. Nicolello)
 Veterans and Senior Affairs (Chair: James D. Kennedy)
 Towns, Villages, and Cities (Chair: Mazi Melesa Pilip)

Law 

All legislation intended to become local law is introduced as an issue on the floor. If passed, it becomes local law and is codified either in the Nassau County Administrative Code or the Miscellaneous Laws of Nassau County. Ordinances and Resolutions are also passed the same way, but are not codified.

References

External links 
 
 Official history

County governing bodies in the United States
County government agencies in New York (state)
Nassau County, New York